St. Michael-Albertville High School (also referred to as "STMA High School") is a public high school located in St. Michael, Minnesota, United States. Known as "STMA" for short, the high school located to a new building which opened for the 20092010 school year. Its Performing Arts Center (PAC) stands as the largest in the state as well and is often compared to many college-level PACs. A formal dedication of the school took place on September 20, 2009.

Student achievement ranks in the top 7% in Science, 12% in Math and 15% in English among Minnesota schools. ACT scores rank STMA in the top 15% of Minnesota high schools and STMA High School is recognized as an AP Honor Roll school.

The school also houses a new Activity Center, which includes an indoor running track and raised walking track, six interchangeable basketball/volleyball courts and a state of the art, 5000 square ft. fitness center/weight room. All the machines and equipment were donated by Matt Spaeth.

The school district is well known for its athletic departments, especially the school's wrestling team which are 9X state champions and the school's football team, which won the state championships for the first time in 2015

On February 7, 2017, the STMA community voted to approve a $36.1 million bond referendum. Bond projects included improvements in the areas of safety, technology, maintenance, and activities. 12 classrooms were added along with a new stadium and more security. Construction dates were from September 2017 to July 20, 2018.

Notable alumni
 Matt Spaeth is notable at STMA for playing both football and basketball. He helped bring the football team to the state tournament twice in 2000 and 2001.  He later went on to play football for the University of Minnesota, where he was named a First Team All American, received the John Mackey Award in 2006, and helped the Gophers on their way to the Insight Bowl. He did not play due to a shoulder injury.  In 2007, he was drafted to the Pittsburgh Steelers of the NFL as the third round pick, 77th overall, and owns a Super Bowl ring.  Prior to the 2011 season he was traded to the Chicago Bears. He re-signed with the Steelers in the 2013 offseason. After failing a physical, Spaeth was released in 2016.
 Mitch Potter is notable at STMA for track and field. In high school, he won five state Track and Field titles, and in August 2012 still held two state records in the Class A 300-meter hurdles and 4 X 400 meter relay. He was a member of the 1999 STMA Track Team that won the MSHSL Track & Field Class A Championship and was inducted into the St. Michael-Albertville High School Hall of Fame in August 2012.
 Chas Betts is notable at STMA as a state wrestling champion. He went on to wrestle for The United States Olympic Training Site at Northern Michigan University. As an amateur wrestler, he won the 2012 U.S. Olympic Trials at 84 kg GR and competed at the 2012 Olympics. He is currently a professional wrestler in the WWE, under the name Chad Gable.

Activities 
Keith Cornell was named the new activities director and started prior to the 20172018 school year. The STMA Activities Department currently offers 25 official extra-curricular activities and 15 official co-curricular activities.

Starting the 20192020 School year STMA will be joining the Lake Conference following recommendations from the Minnesota State High School League, bringing the number of schools in the conference to 7. STMA will be the second smallest school in the conference.

State Championships

Wrestling

References

External links
 Minnesota State High School League
 New 2009 St. Michael-Albertville High School - Donlar Construction 
 St Michael Patch: St. Michael-Albertville Announces 2012 Inductees to the Hall of Fame

Public high schools in Minnesota
Educational institutions established in 1966
Schools in Wright County, Minnesota
1966 establishments in Minnesota